William Lee Morrisette (November 21, 1894 – March 25, 1966) was an American Major League Baseball pitcher.

References

Major League Baseball pitchers
Philadelphia Athletics players
Detroit Tigers players
Baseball players from Maryland
1894 births
1966 deaths
Baltimore Orioles (IL) players
Raleigh Capitals players
Richmond Climbers players
Chattanooga Lookouts players
Jersey City Skeeters players
Hamilton Tigers (baseball) players
Toledo Mud Hens players
St. Joseph Saints players
Moline Plowboys players
Dallas Steers players